The electoral district of West Hobart, sometimes referred to as Hobart West, was an electoral district of the Tasmanian House of Assembly. It was based in Tasmania's capital city, Hobart.

The seat was created as a single-member seat ahead of the 1871 election following the dissolution of the multi-member Hobart Town seat. In 1886, it became a two-member seat, and at the 1897 election, it was abolished when the seat of Hobart was created under a trial of the Hare-Clark model.

The seat was then recreated as a single-member seat at the 1903 election and was abolished when the Tasmanian parliament adopted the Hare-Clark electoral model for the entire state in 1909.

Members for West Hobart

References
 
 
 Parliament of Tasmania (2006). The Parliament of Tasmania from 1956

Former electoral districts of Tasmania
1871 establishments in Australia
1909 disestablishments in Australia